Su-ji, also spelled Soo-ji, is a Korean unisex given name. it is primarily used by women.  The meaning differs based on the hanja used to write each syllable of the name. There are 67 hanja with the reading "su" and 46 hanja with the reading "ji" on the South Korean government's official list of hanja which may be used in given names.

People with this name include:
Kang Susie (born 1967), South Korean singer and radio host
Suji Kwock Kim (born 1969), American poet and playwright of Korean descent
Suji Park (born 1985), South Korean-born New Zealand ceramic sculptor and artist
Jang Soo-ji (born 1987), South Korean field hockey player
Kim Su-ji (volleyball) (born 1987), South Korean volleyball player
Kim Su-ji (diver) (born 1988), South Korean diver
Shin Soo-ji (born 1991), South Korean rhythmic gymnast
Bae Suzy (born 1994), South Korean actress and singer
Lee Su-ji (born 1998), South Korean actress and singer, member of UNI.T

Fictional characters with this name include:
Su-ji, in 2010 South Korean film Love, In Between
Jung Su-ji, in 2011 South Korean film Sunny

See also
List of Korean given names

References

Korean unisex given names